Yoshio Ikeda (池田芳夫) (born January 1, 1942, Osaka) is a Japanese jazz double-bassist.

Ikeda received formal training in bass before studying jazz with Gary Peacock in the 1960s. He led his own small groups in the 1970s, and has worked with Terumasa Hino, Masabumi Kikuchi, Steve Lacy, Akira Miyazawa, Yuji Ohno, Allan Praskin, Masahiko Sato, Masahiko Togashi, Kiyoshi Sugimoto, Aki Takase, and Sadao Watanabe.

References

Japanese jazz double-bassists
Musicians from Tokyo
1942 births
Living people